Vieregg may refer to one of the following:

 Artur Vieregg, German figure skater
 Elisabeth Helene von Vieregg (1679-1704), German-Danish countess and wife of Frederick IV of Denmark
 Vieregg Township, Merrick County, Nebraska